The 60th Hong Kong–Macau Interport was held in Macau on 11 June 2004. Hong Kong captured the champion by winning 2-1.

Squads

Hong Kong

Hong Kong was represented by its under-20 team.
 Directors: Martin Hong, Lawrence Yu Kam-kee
 Coach: Lai Sun Cheung
 Goalkeeper coach: Chu Kwok Kuen
 Assistant coach: Chan Hiu Ming
 Physio: Lui Yat Hong

Macau
The following only shows the players played in the match.

Results

References

Hong Kong–Macau Interport
Macau
Hong